Renk is a town in South Sudan.

Location
Renk is located in Renk County, Eastern Nile State, in the northeastern part of South Sudan, close to the International border with the Republic of Sudan. The geographical coordinates of Renk are: Latitude: 11.8300; Longitude: 32.8000.

Overview
Renk is a small, but growing town, that lies on the eastern banks of the White Nile River. With the attainment of independence by South Sudan, on 9 July 2011, the town is poised to grow in size and economic significance, in the years to come.

Climate

Population
In the 2008, the population of the town was about 69,079.

Transportation
There is one main road that goes through town. Towards the south it leads, after passing through several smaller towns, to the city of Malakal, in Upper Nile State, South Sudan. Towards the north, the road leads to the twin cities of Rabak and Kosti in White Nile State, in the Republic of Sudan. Renk is also served by Renk Airport.

Economy
The economy of Renk and surrounding Renk County is primarily dependent on subsistence agriculture and nomadic animal husbandry. However, seismic studies have identified significant petroleum deposits in Renk County and other areas of Upper Nile State. The maximum exploitation of these deposits is yet to be achieved. Renk is mass agricultural,  and makes about  35% Gum (Arabic) internationally,  and more than 80% of sourgum and (simsim) in all South Sudan.

Points of interest
The following points of interest are found in or near Renk:
 The offices of Renk Town Council
 The headquarters of Renk County Administration
 Sudan-South Sudan Border Crossing 
 The Malakal–Rabak Road – The Road passes through town in a north to south direction
 The White Nile – The town of Renk lies on the eastern bank of the river
 Renk Airport – Civilian airport serving the town ad neighboring communities
 A branch of Ivory Bank
 A branch of Nile Commercial Bank

See also
 Renk Airport
 Upper Nile (state)
 Greater Upper Nile

References

External links
Location of Renk at Google Maps
Needs Assessment Study of Renk County In 2008

Populated places in Upper Nile (state)
Greater Upper Nile